Townleyhall passage grave is a chamber tomb located around 2 km north of Dowth tomb. It is part of the megalithic complex of Brú na Bóinne in County Louth, Ireland.

It is located outside the World Heritage Site core area but (just) inside the buffer zone.

The site was originally a Neolithic settlement but was abandoned by its occupants, perhaps because it was a temporary site serving the construction project or due to the death of a senior member, and turned into a passage grave. Unlike its more famous neighbours in the Boyne valley, the tomb consists of a single chamber that merges with the entrance passage making it an undifferentiated passage grave.

Townleyhall was excavated by George Eogan in 1962, work which found Carrowkeel ware pottery providing the first indication that Ireland's passage graves were of Neolithic date. Following this many of the other sites in the area were dug, although the methods used at the time would be considered crude by today's standards.

References

External links

 Pictures
 Images from Knowth.com

Archaeological sites in County Louth
Boyne culture
World Heritage Sites in the Republic of Ireland
Megalithic monuments in Ireland
National Monuments in County Louth
Burial monuments and structures in Ireland
Tombs in the Republic of Ireland